Vadamalapeta is a mandal headquarters in Tirupati district of the Indian state of Andhra Pradesh. It is located on the outskirts of the famous Tirupati city. It falls in the jurisdictional limit of Tirupati Urban Development Authority. It is part of Vadamalapeta mandal, which is under the jurisdiction of Tirupati revenue division. Vadamalapeta mandal, along with its villages including Vadamalapeta was made part of the newly formed Tirupati district on 4 April 2022.

Geography
It has an average elevation of 252. The temple of Lord Sri Venkateswara temple is located in Appalayagunta village under Vadamalapeta mandal. A.M.Puram (Abbikandriga) is the village with highest literacy rate in Vadamalapeta Mandal (taluk).

Village Code

Vadamalapeta Mandal population list 
As per the 2021 Aadhar estimates, Vadamalapeta Mandal population in 2021 is 40,185 Out of which Male are 19,380, Female are 20,805. (Ratio is 100 Male  :107 Female)

Vadamalapeta Mandal has a total of 22 locations/villages, Below is the population table showing male, female and household information in the Tirupati district.

References 

Mandal headquarters in Tirupati district
Villages in Tirupati district
Tirupati district